Gradimir Crnogorac (born 14 November 1982) is a Bosnian professional football manager and former player. He was most recently the manager of Bosnian Premier League club Sloboda Tuzla.

International career
Crnogorac made his debut for Bosnia and Herzegovina in an April 2004 friendly match against Finland and has earned a total of 3 caps, scoring no goals. His final international game was an October 2004 FIFA World Cup qualification match against Serbia and Montenegro.

Managerial statistics

References

External links
Gradimir Crnogorac at linkedin.com

1982 births
Living people
Sportspeople from Tuzla
Association football central defenders
Bosnia and Herzegovina footballers
Bosnia and Herzegovina international footballers
FK Sloboda Tuzla players
FK Budućnost Banovići players
Randers FC players
Akademisk Boldklub players
NK Bratstvo Gračanica players
FC Atyrau players
FC Kaisar players
NK Zvijezda Gradačac players
OFK Gradina players
Premier League of Bosnia and Herzegovina players
First League of the Federation of Bosnia and Herzegovina players
Danish 1st Division players
Russian First League players
Kazakhstan Premier League players
Bosnia and Herzegovina expatriate footballers
Expatriate men's footballers in Denmark
Bosnia and Herzegovina expatriate sportspeople in Denmark
Expatriate footballers in Russia
Bosnia and Herzegovina expatriate sportspeople in Russia
Expatriate footballers in Kazakhstan
Bosnia and Herzegovina expatriate sportspeople in Kazakhstan
Bosnia and Herzegovina football managers
FK Sloboda Tuzla managers
Premier League of Bosnia and Herzegovina managers
FC Spartak Nizhny Novgorod players